Bankers Loan and Trust Company Building is a Queen Anne style historic building located in Concordia, Kansas that is listed on the National Register of Historic Places.  It is a two-story, Queen Anne-style brick building and was constructed in 1887 and 1888 by W. H. Parsons and C. Howard Parsons of Topeka.  The building features a prominent corner entrance with wrap-around stairs and archways.  An oriel window is on the second story above the entrance.

References

See also
 National Register of Historic Places listings in Cloud County, Kansas

Buildings and structures in Cloud County, Kansas
Bank buildings on the National Register of Historic Places in Kansas
Tourist attractions in Cloud County, Kansas
National Register of Historic Places in Cloud County, Kansas